King of Dodge City is a 1941 American Western film directed by Lambert Hillyer and written by Gerald Geraghty. The film stars Wild Bill Elliott, Tex Ritter, Judith Linden, Dub Taylor, Guy Usher and Rick Anderson. The film was released on August 14, 1941, by Columbia Pictures.

Plot

Cast          
Wild Bill Elliott as Wild Bill Hickok
Tex Ritter as Tex Rawlings
Judith Linden as Janice Blair
Dub Taylor as Cannonball Taylor
Guy Usher as Morgan King
Rick Anderson as Judge Lynch
Kenneth Harlan as Jeff Carruthers
Pierce Lyden as Reynolds
Francis Walker as Carney
Harrison Greene as Stephen Kimball
Jack Rockwell as Martin

References

External links
 

1941 films
American Western (genre) films
1941 Western (genre) films
Columbia Pictures films
Films directed by Lambert Hillyer
American black-and-white films
1940s English-language films
1940s American films